Santiago Aldama Toledo (born 10 January 2001) is a Spanish professional basketball player for the Memphis Grizzlies of the National Basketball Association (NBA). He played college basketball for the Loyola Greyhounds. He was named most valuable player (MVP) of the 2019 FIBA U18 European Championship.

He is the son of Spanish basketball player Santiago Aldama, an Olympian at the 1992 Summer Olympics in Barcelona.

Early life and career
Aldama was brought up in Las Palmas, Gran Canaria, Spain. He started playing basketball at age three because his father, Santiago Aldama, and uncle, played the sport professionally. Aldama grew up idolizing basketball players Pau Gasol, Juan Carlos Navarro and Kobe Bryant.

Since his introduction to basketball, Aldama played for Canterbury Basketball Academy in Las Palmas and later chose to remain there, despite receiving offers from bigger clubs like FC Barcelona, Real Madrid and Gran Canaria. At the 2017 Spanish Under-16 Championship, he averaged 18.9 points, 5.1 rebounds and 3.6 assists per game, playing for Canterbury alongside Oumar Ballo. He helped his team to a surprising third-place finish behind FC Barcelona and Real Madrid. In 2018, Aldama played on loan for the FC Barcelona under-18 team at Ciutat de L'Hospitalet qualifiers in the Adidas Next Generation tournament.

Recruiting
On 5 August 2019, Aldama announced his commitment to play college basketball in the United States for Loyola–Maryland. He was drawn to the school because his father knew assistant coach Ivo Simović and due to Aldama's hopes of an eventual business career, and he felt comfortable when he visited the school in June. Considered a four-star recruit and a high-major talent, Aldama's decision to play for a mid-major program took many analysts by surprise. Evan Daniels of 247Sports.com called him "one of the biggest college-bound international steals in quite a while."

College career
Aldama missed the first three months of his freshman season with a knee injury that required surgery. He made his collegiate debut for Loyola–Maryland on 1 February 2020, scoring 11 points in 17 minutes in a 79–73 win over Navy. Aldama was named Patriot League Rookie of the Week three times in the span of four weeks. At the end of the regular season, he was named to the Patriot League All-Rookie Team. On 3 March, he scored a season-high 23 points in a 78–75 loss to Lehigh in the first round of the Patriot League tournament. Aldama averaged 15.2 points, 7.6 rebounds, 2.1 assists and 1.7 blocks in 10 games as a freshman.

On 13 February 2021, Aldama posted 30 points and 22 rebounds in a 97–94 triple overtime loss to Lafayette. He set the program record and matched Adonal Foyle's Patriot League record for rebounds in a game. On 10 March 2021, Aldama scored a career-high 33 points and 12 rebounds, shooting 13-of-15 from the field, in a 67–63 win against Army at the Patriot League tournament semifinals. He helped Loyola advance to its first-ever Patriot League final. As a sophomore, he averaged 21.2 points, 10.1 rebounds, 2.3 assists and 1.7 blocks per game, earning First Team All-Patriot League honors. On 14 April 2021, Aldama declared for the 2021 NBA draft while maintaining his college eligibility. He later decided to remain in the draft.

Professional career

Memphis Grizzlies (2021–present)
Aldama was drafted with the 30th overall pick of the 2021 NBA draft by the Utah Jazz. His rights were later traded to the Memphis Grizzlies. On 8 August 2021, the Grizzlies announced that they had signed Aldama. On 2 December 2021, Aldama scored a season-high 18 points with ten rebounds, three assists, a steal and a block in a 152–79 blowout win over the Oklahoma City Thunder.

Aldama joined the Grizzlies' 2022 NBA Summer League roster. On 18 July 2022, he was named to the All-NBA Summer League Second Team. With Jaren Jackson Jr. sidelined, Aldama was named the Grizzlies' starting power forward to open the 2022–23 season. He made his first career start in the team's season opener on 19 October, recording a double-double of 18 points and eleven rebounds in a 115–112 overtime win over the New York Knicks. On 2 February 2023, Aldama scored a career-high 21 points, alongside ten rebounds, in a 128–113 loss to the Cleveland Cavaliers.

National team career
Aldama made his national team debut for Spain at the 2017 FIBA U16 European Championship in Podgorica, Montenegro, averaging nine points and 5.4 rebounds per game. He led his team to a gold medal at the 2019 FIBA U18 European Championship in Volos, Greece, averaging 18 points, 7.6 rebounds, 2.6 assists, 2.3 blocks and 1.9 steals per game. Aldama was named tournament most valuable player (MVP) and joined his teammate Usman Garuba on the All-Star Five.

Career statistics

NBA

|-
| style="text-align:left;"| 
| style="text-align:left;"| Memphis
| 32 || 0 || 11.3 || .402 || .125 || .625 || 2.7 || .7 || .2 || .3 || 4.1
|- class="sortbottom"
| style="text-align:center;" colspan="2"| Career
| 32 || 0 || 11.3 || .402 || .125 || .625 || 2.7 || .7 || .2 || .3 || 4.1

College

|-
| style="text-align:left;"| 2019–20
| style="text-align:left;"| Loyola
| 10 || 9 || 30.4 || .459 || .217 || .515 || 7.6 || 2.1 || .9 || 1.7 || 15.2
|-
| style="text-align:left;"| 2020–21
| style="text-align:left;"| Loyola
| 17 || 17 || 35.0 || .513 || .368 || .686 || 10.1 || 2.3 || 1.0 || 1.7 || 21.2
|- class="sortbottom"
| style="text-align:center;" colspan="2"| Career
| 27 || 26 || 33.3 || .495 || .306 || .639 || 9.2 || 2.2 || 1.0 || 1.7 || 19.0

Personal life
Aldama's father, Santiago Aldama, played professional basketball in Spain and Portugal and joined the Spanish national team at the 1992 Summer Olympics. His uncle, also played professional basketball in Spain, Italy and Portugal.

References

External links
Loyola Greyhounds bio

2001 births
Living people
Centers (basketball)
Loyola Greyhounds men's basketball players
Memphis Grizzlies players
Memphis Hustle players
National Basketball Association players from Spain
Power forwards (basketball)
Spanish expatriate basketball people in the United States
Spanish men's basketball players
Sportspeople from Las Palmas
Utah Jazz draft picks